List of esports events in 2021 (also known as professional gaming).

Calendar of events

Tournaments

Professional league seasons

References

 
Esports by year